The Microhylinae are a subfamily of microhylid frogs. It contains 9 genera. Phylogenetic studies have estimated the family Microhylidae to be about 52 million years old.

Genera
The following genera are recognised in the subfamily Microhylinae:

 Glyphoglossus Günther, 1869
 Kaloula Gray, 1831
 Metaphrynella Parker, 1934
 Microhyla Tschudi, 1838
 Micryletta Dubois, 1987
 Mysticellus Sonali & Biju, 2019
Nanohyla 
Phrynella Boulenger, 1887
 Uperodon Duméril & Bibron, 1841

References

External links
Amphibian and Reptiles of Peninsular Malaysia - Microhylidae

Microhylidae
Amphibian subfamilies
Taxa named by Albert Günther